Open Up to Me is a 2013 Finnish film directed and written by Simo Halinen. It tells a story of Maarit (Leea Klemola), a woman who has just gone through a sex reassignment surgery. She wants to rebuild her relationship to her teenage daughter and is also looking for a man to share her life with. The film was nominated for the 2013 Nordic Council Film Prize.

Reception

The film has received favorable reviews. While some writers have criticized the story for not having enough twists and turns, the work of actors has been praised almost unanimously. On 2 February 2014, Open Up to Me received two Jussi Awards; one for Leea Klemola (Best Actress in a Leading Role) and another for Halinen (Best Screenplay).

Main cast 

Leea Klemola as Maarit  
Peter Franzén as Sami 
Ria Kataja as Julia 
Emmi Nivala as Pinja 
Alex Anton as Teo 
Maria Heiskanen as Silva
Olavi Uusivirta as Hatakka

References

External links

2013 films
2013 LGBT-related films
Finnish LGBT-related films
Films about trans women
2010s Finnish-language films
Finnish drama films
LGBT-related drama films